Clathria aceratoobtusa is a species of sponge in the family Microcionidae. The genus Clathria is subdivided into a number of subgenera, and it is in the subgenus Microciona. It is native to shallow water habitats in the Indo-Pacific region. The type locality is the Gulf of Thailand.

Description
They are either flush with the smooth surface or slightly raised. The inhalant pores are tiny and scattered over the surface, giving a net-like effect. The texture is firm and the living sponge is a bright orange-red colour.

Distribution
Clathria aceratoobtusa occurs in the tropical Indo-Pacific region, its range including Myanmar, Malaysia, Thailand, the Philippines, Micronesia and northern Australia.

In the 21st century, it has appeared for the first time in Gulf of Mannar Marine National Park in southern India, where it is causing concern by its invasiveness.

Ecology
Coral reefs in tropical seas are biodiverse communities where corals, sponges, coralline algae, seaweeds and other organisms compete for space and nutrients. Clathria aceratoobtusa is an encrusting sponge found on reefs growing over the surface of rocks, bivalve molluscs, shell debris, coral colonies and worm tubes. In India, where this sponge is a non-native, invasive species, the corals most affected by it are Porites, Acropora, Montipora, Favia and especially Turbinaria, which appears to be its favoured substrate. The sponge cannot easily be separated from the coral because it penetrates into the tissues. The corals in the Gulf of Mannar have a tendency to bleach and the sponge may be thriving there because of the corals' weakened state. In Yemen, where the sponge has also expanded its range, the coral most affected is Porites lutea.

References

Poecilosclerida
Fauna of the Indian Ocean
Fauna of the Pacific Ocean
Animals described in 1887
Taxa named by Henry John Carter